T. laeta may refer to:

 Termessa laeta, an Australian moth
 Teucholabis laeta, a crane fly
 Thaumaglossa laeta, a skin beetle
 Thienemannimyia laeta, a non-biting midge
 Tithrone laeta, a praying mantis
 Tmesorrhina laeta, a flower chafer
 Trypeta laeta, a fruit fly